Kathrin "Trina" Zimmermann, known in history as Trina Papisten ('Trina the Papist') (died 30 August 1701), was a Pomeranian alleged witch. She is referred to as the last person to be executed for sorcery in the city of Stolp (Słupsk).

Her real name was Katharina Zimmermann. She was born in Brilon, Westphalia and of Catholic faith (Papist is an abusive term for Catholics). Her first husband, Martin Nipkow, served with the dragoons in Brilon and took her to his hometown of Stolp. After his death she married a butcher, Andreas Zimmermann from Stolp. Katharina Zimmermann turned out to be a great merchant and soon threatened the competition of the neighbouring butcher's shopkeepers. In addition, she was quite well acquainted with folk medicine and did not integrate too much with the Lutheran inhabitants. The accusation of witchcraft by Catholics was recognized by the Protestant community as religiously motivated. On 27 July 1701 the Faculty of Law of the University of Rostock issued a legal opinion authorising torture against the accused. She was brought before a court which, after torture, sentenced her to be burned at the stake.

In 2016, a road was named after Trina Papisten in Słupsk.

References

People from Brilon
People from Słupsk
1701 deaths
18th-century Roman Catholic martyrs
People executed for witchcraft
Witch trials in Poland
Witch trials in Germany
People executed by burning
18th-century executions